Janani D/O Madhavan is a Singaporean Tamil-language soap opera that aired on MediaCorp Vasantham from 11 July 2014 to 31 October 2014 for 17 episodes. The show starred Shabir and Sanchala. It was produced by Divya Anjan and was directed and written by Jaya Rathakrishnanby.

Cast

Season 1
Shabir as Madhavan
 Sanchala as Janani
 Rishi Kumar 
 Muzammil Elias Mikhail
 Meenaksh
 Lakshna Lakshmi
 Kayalvily
 Janani Rajalingam
 Jagan Chandromohan
 Bharathi Rani Arunachalam
 Bhama Nair
 Balraj Devandran
Future Mahesh in Part3
 Jasmin Michael (Special appearance for Nila Thoonguthu Song)
R.Maheshwaran as special appearance for song as Mahesh

Seasons overview

Season 2
 Janani D/O Madhavan (season 2)
Janani D/O Madhavan Season 2 aired from 6 January 2017 to 31 March 2017.

Original soundtrack
It was written by Shabir, composed by Shabir. It was sung by Shabir. The music was produced by Buvaneshwaran and Kenneth Yong and the background score by Ameale.

Soundtrack

Broadcast
Series was released on 11 July  2014 on Mediacorp Vasantham. It aired in Malaysia on Mediacorp Vasantham, Its full length episodes and released its episodes on their app Toggle, a live TV feature was introduced on Toggle with English Subtitle.

References

External links 
 Vasantham Official Website

Tamil-language children's television series
Tamil-language school television series
Singapore Tamil dramas
2014 Tamil-language television series debuts
2014 Tamil-language television series endings
2014 Tamil-language television seasons
Vasantham TV original programming
Tamil-language television shows in Singapore